The Packard Patrician is an automobile which was built by the Packard Motor Car Company of Detroit, Michigan, from model years 1951 through 1956.  During its six years in production, the Patrician was built in Packard's Detroit facilities on East Grand Boulevard. The word "patrician" is Latin for a ruling class in Ancient Rome. It was the last "senior level" Packard until production ended in 1958.

The Patrician was the last of the "senior Packards" and was briefly available as an extended length limousine for 1953 and 1954 called the Corporate Executive which found few buyers.

Packard Patrician 400, 1951–1952

In 1951 and 1952, the automaker attempted to use a numeric naming structure that designated Packard's least expensive models as Packard 200 and 200 Deluxe while two-door hardtop and convertibles were designated Packard 250 and its mid-range sedan the Packard 300.

The highest trim level available was the Packard Patrician 400.  The Patrician 400 replaced the previous model year's Super 8 model range. The car was easily identified from other Packards by its chrome trim; in 1951 the model featured three chrome ports on its rear fenders and in 1952 the car featured four chrome ports, a styling approach similar to GM's Buick luxury vehicles.  Patricians and 300s also sported a slightly revised grille  which included chrome "teeth" in its oval area in 1951. That change occurred to the 250 series soon after introduction.

The Patrician 400 was available only as a premium, four-door sedan, outfitted with high-grade upholstery and chrome trimming within. For the 1952 model year, Packard retained the services of noted interior decorator Dorothy Draper to bring a fresh look to the interior color scheme. Wilton carpeting and hassock-style rear passenger foot rests were also included with the car. With a list price of $3,662 ($ in  dollars ) it also was the most expensive senior Packard offered. The automobile rode upon a  wheelbase shared only with the 300 sedan.

The Patrician got the best engine Packard had to offer, too. For unequaled smooth operation, its engine featured nine main bearings instead of five as in the other engines without increase in power.

Until 1954, Henney built a few nine-passenger Executive Sedans and Corporate Limousines on a chassis with  wheelbase. Derham in Rosemont built very few Patrician Custom Formal Sedans with leather padded roofs, small backlights and elaborate interiors on the standard Patrician frame.

Introduction of the Patrician was, together with most other Packards (250s were delayed), in August 1950. Production totals for 1951 came to 9,001 Patrician 400 units, and 3,975 units for 1952.

The 400 model name was dropped for model years 1953 and 1954; however the Patrician name continued to occupy the premium trim level Packard from 1953 through 1956.

1953–1954

For model years 1953 and 1954, the Patrician continued to represent Packard's highest trim level sedans and rode on the  wheelbase chassis. The Patrician also was used for the basis of the custom bodied Henney passenger models, including the  8-passenger Packard Executive Sedans and Limousines, the difference being that the latter had a partition window between the front and rear compartments. During these years the Patrician received annual trim changes and improvements associated with model-year change-overs in the 1950s. The 1953 Packard Patrician 4-door sedan was listed at US$3,740 ($ in  dollars ) while the all-new Packard Corporate Executive 8-passenger 4-door limousine was listed at US$7,100 ($ in  dollars ).

The Henney professional cars (hearse, ambulance, flower car, service car) built on the  wheelbase commercial chassis generally used Patrician-like trim except for 1954, which used Cavalier-like trim, and was offered in a hardtop bodystyle called the Packard Pacific. Since the professional cars were fully coachbuilt bodies (not conversions) built on Packard's separate commercial chassis, their trim level had little to do with the Patrician except for the general appearance. The Henney Junior, a short-wheelbase hearse or ambulance was built on the standard Cavalier-Patrician chasses (but with stronger, heavy-duty rear suspension) but had the 5-main bearing Cavalier engine rather than the 9-main bearing engine of the Patrician.

For 1953, the Patrician used the same  9-main bearing straight eight engine that used for 1951 and 1952 but for the first time added a four barrel carburetor for an increase in power. For 1954, the new  9-main bearing, aluminum head  engine was standard and also featured a 4-brl carburetor. 1954 was the first year to add a start-position to the ignition key - earlier years were started by a switch built into the carburetor which was actuated by depressing the accelerator pedal to the floor.

A general description implies that all Patrician models were fitted out with standard equipment when in fact they could be built to order. If a customer wanted a manual transmission then that is what he or she would be given by the factory.

1955–1956

For 1955, the entire senior line of Packards received an extensive design update that freshened the last restyling that was done in 1951. Under designer Dick Teague, the Senior Packards received a more modern grille design, "Cathedral"-styled rear tail lights, hooded headlight housings and a new exterior trim layout that afforded Packard the ability to offer two- and three-tone paint combinations with the simplest of masking patterns. While Packard could not afford a whole new greenhouse for the passenger compartment, new trim at the base of the rear pillar made it look like it had a redesigned roofline. The cars were also outfitted with a wrap-around windshield, thus bringing it in line with American automobiles of the era. Inside, upholstery and bright work was also freshened and the cars received a new dashboard layout. 1955 and 1956 instruments and controls were similar, but the 1955 dash featured a warm, bronze-like surface, and in 1956 were faced with a machined-look stainless steel facing. The 1955 Patrician was listed for US$3,890 ($ in  dollars ).

For 1955, the Patrician was offered as a four-door sedan only and Packard produced 9,127 of the cars. It was also the year that the company introduced their only V8 engine. For 1956, minor appearance changes included a revised headlight housing that exaggerated the front peak further forward. The area around the headlight was painted black to give the effect of greater depth. The car also received a different grille texture. During the 1956 model year, 3,375 Patricians rolled off Packard's production line before the model was dropped by the ailing carmaker.

The final Packard built (that was a true Packard and not a badge-engineered Studebaker President) was a black Patrician sedan, and it rolled off the Packard assembly line on June 25, 1956.

1957–1958
While Packard's James Nance had hoped to divorce the senior Packard from its lower-priced Clipper models for 1956 and beyond, Studebaker-Packard's Corporate finances were far worse than Nance bargained for after the 1954 merger between the two firms. Following disposal of Packard's body supplier, Briggs, to Chrysler, Packard bought the old Connor Avenue Briggs plant to produce their own bodies and switched entire production there completely, abandoning the East Grand Boulevard plant. Quality control was terrible and because of this, and a failure by American Motors to buy as many Ultramatic transmission units and Packard V-8's as Nance had hoped for, Packard production was eliminated at the firm's ex Briggs Detroit factory and transferred to Studebaker's South Bend complex for the 1957 model year.

The Packard V8 was used in the slow selling Hudson Hornet and Nash Ambassador for 1955 and 1956 and also the 1956 Studebaker Golden Hawk.

The sole Packard offered for 1957, a badge-engineered Studebaker President, was designated the Packard Clipper.  A McCulloch supercharger was used with the Studebaker V8 in the Packard Hawk which was also later made. The final Packard, a car with no series name, rolled off the line in 1958 and Studebaker-Packard's Board removed the "Packard" name from its corporate name in 1962.

Bad management and particularly Mr. Christopher have been blamed for the company's demise. In fact the best management in the world could not have competed with GM s power. For example if there was no market for Cadillac 62's the same Fisher body would be switched to Buick or Oldsmobile. For example Fisher A Type bodies were Chevrolet Stylemaster, Pontiac 25 or 27 or Oldsmobile 66. B type bodies were either Pontiac 26 or 28, Buick 40 or Cadillac 61. Packard could not do that. At best they had two brands (Packard and Clipper) one ageing body, no station wagon, a new V8 to pay for, a partner in severe debt and the loss of defense contracts to GM. The result was a 35-acre waste land.

See also
 ZIL-111

Further reading

 Pierson, Don, Packard / IMPERIAL page

Packard vehicles
Rear-wheel-drive vehicles